Constituency P-117 is a local political division in Pakistan. Its full name is PP-117 Mandi Bahauddin-II (.)  P-117 elected Tariq Mehmood Sahi as Member of Provincial Assembly of the Punjab (MPA) in 2008. He belongs to the Pakistan Peoples Party Parliamentarians (PPPP) political party.

There are 8 union councils in the Provincial Assembly Constituency.

The last election of local bodies was held in 1991.

In 2008 the total number of registered voters was 147,163.

Main Areas

 Mandi Bahauddin M.C.
 Chilianwala Qanungo Halqa
 Mandi Bahauddin Qanungo Halqa of Mandi Bahauddin tehsil excluding the following patwar Circles
 Wasu
 Chak No.02
 Chak Basaua
 Hardo Bohat
 Charund
 Dhok Daud of Mandi Bahauddin District.
 Dhok Kasib
 Phiray

Election Results 2008

 Registered Voters 147,163
 Votes              75,384
 Valid Votes        70,092
 Rejected Votes      1,570
 Voter participation 51.22%

Ranking of political parties

 Pakistan Peoples Party Parliamentarians
 Pakistan Muslim League (N)
 Pakistan Muslim League
 Other parties

Notes

References

PP-116